Alice Jones may refer to:

Alice Gray Jones (1852–1943), Welsh poet and editor
Alice Jones (author) (1853–1933), Canadian author and travel essayist
Alice Jones (poet), American poet and physician
Alice Jones (skier) (born 1976), Australian Olympic alpine skier
Alice Jones (swimmer), participated in Swimming at the 1971 Pan American Games
Alice Eleanor Jones (1916–1981), American science fiction writer and journalist
Alice Palache Jones (1907–1989), American banker
Alice Jones, character in the TV series Casey Jones

See also
Mary Alice Jones (1898–?), author of religious books for children